Insurrection is an Irish docudrama written by Hugh Leonard and directed by Michael Garvey and Louis Lentin. It was first broadcast on Telefís Éireann in Ireland on 10 April 1966 and later on the BBC in the United Kingdom, ABC in Australia and several other European countries. Only one series of eight episodes was made, with each episode broadcast on consecutive nights. The series was repeated only once when, on 1 May 1966, it was shown in its entirety.

The series portrays the 1916 Easter Rising which was mounted by Irish republicans to end British rule in Ireland and establish an independent Irish Republic. The events were reconstructed as it might have been seen by an Irish television service at the time. Ray McAnally acted as the studio anchor of a news programme that presented daily coverage of the Rising as it unfolded, with Telefís Éireann reporters broadcasting on the spot updates of the events and conducting interviews with key participants. Along with the key figures of the insurrection, the series also looked at the action in the General Post Office, Liberty Hall and events like the Battle of Mount Street Bridge. Incidents outside Dublin such as the arrest of Roger Casement, the sinking of the Aud and the battle of Ashbourne were introduced into the programmes as filmed news items of the day. McAnally interviewed guests in studio and also used models and street maps to clarify details for the viewers.

Insurrection has received critical acclaim from television critics. Described in the RTV Guide as "undoubtedly the most difficult and ambitious project ever attempted by Irish television", the series formed the centrepiece of Telefís Éireann's 1916 golden jubilee commemoration. It was regarded as pioneering in its use of the outside broadcast unit to record drama on location and its presentation of an historical event in the style of modern TV war reporting. This technique was borrowed from the 1964 BBC TV film Culloden.

On 8 March 2016, RTÉ announced that Insurrection would be rebroadcast as part of their 1916 centenary commemoration.

Production

Development

In the summer of 1965, the director-general of Telefís Éireann, Kevin McCourt, selected a group of senior production and administrative staff to arrange a programme scheme for the 1966 golden jubilee of the Easter Rising. In addition to planning the outside broadcast coverage of public ceremonials, Telefís Éireann also intended to make programmes to give the historical background to the Rising. One of the early proposals - a commissioned drama based on the events of the Rising - was discussed but considered impractical on both technical and cost grounds. The view of the broadcasting authority was reportedly that all programming should place more emphasis on the surviving participants of the Rising, rather than a re-assessment by historians. After detailed revision by the producers’ group during August 1965, four main programme strands emerged. As part of these four strands, the programme planning committee returned to the previously rejected idea of an historical drama.

Hugh Leonard was commissioned to write the scripts and described his task as 'an invitation no writer in his senses could turn down; an opportunity to write a definitive television history of the most improbable insurrection of this or any other century.' Assisted by historian Kevin B. Nowlan, Leonard's script was heavily influenced by Max Caulfield's The Easter Rebellion, which had been published in 1964.

Location filming

Although Telefís Éireann was only four years old, the outside broadcast and film units had gained excellent experience in event coverage, notably during the visit of President John F. Kennedy to Ireland in 1963. In addition to event coverage, the outside broadcast unit was used in another way. At the time, filming drama was a slow and expensive process, but the outside broadcast unit staff developed a cost-effective and innovative method using electronic cameras to record drama on location. This practice had increased Telefís Éireann's drama output, taken pressure off scarce studio time and brought some Irish TV drama away from the traditional studio set - most notably The Riordans.

During November and December 1965 Michael Garvey directed several film sequences, including the sinking of the Aud at Banna Strand and the Battle of Ashbourne. Extras were provided by the Irish Defence Forces. Louis Lentin also filmed several sequences, beginning with the lancers’ charge in Sackville Street. Filming on O'Connell Street proved to be quite a challenge, not only due to the proliferation of contemporary signage, bus stops, TV aerials and cars, but also because of the large numbers of interested onlookers. Nearby householders were persuaded to remove rooftop TV aerials, change curtains that were too modern in design and hide garden ornaments.

Studio filming

When the film inserts were complete, work began in the studios. Unfortunately, by late 1965, several buildings in Dublin connected with 1916, such as Liberty Hall, the South Dublin Union and the Mendicity Institute, were gone or modified beyond recognition. So essential locations such as Clanwilliam House were recreated as studio sets. The GPO interior in Studio 1 was the largest set ever built by Telefís Éireann. The principal designer, Alpho O’Reilly, took great care in ensuring period detail of tunics, weapons, vehicles, furniture and other properties. He had even located the original 1916 GPO clock in a Board of Works store. For actors, crew and production staff this studio GPO was to prove a difficult work environment. The final scenes involved action, special effects and complicated camera plots, and at one point actors and crew had to work surrounded by smoke, explosions and a real fire. Army experts in explosives and armaments, in-house safety officers and professional firemen were constantly on duty.

List of episodes

Cast

TV crew
 Ray McAnally as studio co-ordinator
 Maurice O'Doherty as newscaster
 Gerry Alexander as location report
 Maurie Taylor as location report
 Patrick David Nolan as location report
 Jim Mooney as location report
 Paddy Bartishell as location reporter

Irish revolutionaries
 Eoin Ó Súilleabháin as Patrick H. Pearse
 Jim Norton as Tom Clarke
 Declan Harvey as Joseph Plunkett
 Ronnie Walsh as James Connolly
 Edward Byrne as Thomas MacDonagh
 Liam Devally as Éamonn Ceannt
 Pádraig Ó Gaora as Seán Mac Diarmada
 Gerry Sullivan as Michael Mallin
 Patrick Waldron as Willie Pearse
 Conor Farrington as Sir Roger Casement
 Eddie Golden as Eoin Mac Neill
 Kevin Flood as The O'Rahilly
 Joan O'Hara as Countess Markievicz
 Barry Cassin as Desmond FitzGerald
 Brendan Matthews as Francis Sheehy-Skeffington
 John O'Flynn as Thomas Ashe
 Eddie Doyle as Richard Mulcahy
 Joe Lynch as Cathal Brugha
 Michael McAuliffe as Michael Collins
 Michael Ryan as Michael Malone
 Michael Murray as Lieutenant Mahony
 Seán McCarthy as James Ryan
 Mike Murphy as Volunteer Officer
 Tom O'Rafferty as Volunteer
 Donal McCann as Volunteer
 John O'Shea as John McCarthy
 Sheelagh Cullen as Elizabeth O'Farrell
 Eithne Lydon as Winifred Carney
 Sabina Coyne as Julia Grenan
 Brian Waldron as Richard Murphy
 Tony Doyle as Patrick Doyle
 Pat Laffan as James Fox
 James Caffrey as George Reynolds
 Tom Samway as Volunteer
 Brendan Sullivan as Jimmy Doyle
 John Welsh as James Stephens
 Kevin McHugh as William Ronan
 Vincent Smith as John Joyce
 Niall O'Brien as James Walsh
 Anthony Hennigan as Thomas Walsh
 Vincent Dowling as Volunteer
 Julie Hamilton as Crone
 Séamus Forde as Stephen McKenna
 Robert McLernon as Adjutant Morgan
 Pádraig Fay as Coade

British officers
 Howard Marion-Crawford as General Sir John Maxwell
 Henry Comerford as Captain Bowen-Colhurst
 Peter Mayock as Second Lieutenant Chalmers
 Bill Skinner as Captain Pragnell
 John Franklyn as Colonel Fane
 Denis McCarthy as General Lowe
 Tom Ascough-Patterson as Lieutenant King
 Robert Carlisle Jnr. as air mechanic Pratt

British government officials
 Cecil Barror as Sir Matthew Nathan
 Aidan Grennell as Lord Wimbourne

Minor characters
 Fred Johnson as Trinity College porter
 Cecil Nash as old man
 Jack O'Connor as golfer
 Gerry Tierney as priest
 Ray Mackin as Staines
 Loretta Clarke as first looter
 Patricia Turner as second looter
 Brendan Cauldwell as drunk
 Anna Manahan as housewife
 Arthur O'Sullivan as Captain Purcell
 Pat Layde as Constable O'Brien
 P. J. Donohue as Fr. John Flanagan
 Lillian Rapple as woman
 Anne O'Dwyer as housewife

References

External links
 

1966 Irish television series debuts
1960s Irish television series
RTÉ original programming